The BLAST Paris Major 2023, also known as Blast Major 2023 or Paris 2023, will be the nineteenth Counter-Strike: Global Offensive Major Championship. It will be held in Paris, France at the Accor Arena from May 8 to 21, 2023. Twenty-four teams will qualify via regional major rankings and features a  prize pool. It will be the first Major Championship tournament hosted by Blast.

Background 
Counter-Strike: Global Offensive (CS:GO) is a multiplayer first-person shooter video game developed by Hidden Path Entertainment and Valve Corporation. It is the fourth game in the Counter-Strike series. In professional CS:GO, the Valve-sponsored Majors are the most prestigious tournaments.

The defending Major Champions are Outsiders, who won their first Major championship at IEM Rio Major 2022.

Format

Map Pool

Notes

References 

Counter-Strike competitions
Counter-Strike: Global Offensive Majors